Xenia the Righteous of Rome was a saint of the 5th century, honored by some Christian Churches, including Orthodox and Catholic. Xenia, originally born Eusebia, was the only daughter of a wealthy Senator in Rome. She and two devoted servants of hers, left to avoid an arranged marriage. She escaped to Mylasa, on the island of Kos, where she accepted  name "Xenia" (stranger). She wanted to hide in a deserted place not to be discovered by her parents. 

Upon arrival, Xenia began a church dedicated to the Saint Stephen and a woman's monastery. Soon after, she was made a deaconess by Bishop Paul of Mylasa.

Of her that is written says that she "helped everyone: for the destitute, she was a benefactress; for the grief-stricken, a comforter; for sinners, a guide to repentance. She possessed a deep humility, accounting herself the worst and most sinful of all."

The Feast of St. Xenia is celebrated in the Orthodox church and Catholic church on January 24, the day on which she died. It was alleged that "during her funeral, a luminous wreath of stars surrounding a radiant cross appeared over the monastery in the heavens." She is said to have foreseen her own death.

Notes

References
St. Nikolai Velimirović, Tepsić, Fr. T. Timothy (Translator). The Prologue of Ohrid: Lives of Saints, Hymns, Reflections and Homilies for Every Day of the Year, Vol. 1. Serbian Orthodox Diocese of Western America, 2002.

External Link

Year of birth missing
5th-century deaths
People from Rome
People from Kos
Late Ancient Christian female saints
5th-century Christian saints
5th-century Italo-Roman people
5th-century Roman women
5th-century Italian women